Bondokuy is the capital of Bondokuy Department, Burkina Faso. It has 3,982 inhabitants.

History 
Louis-Gustave Binger arrived here in May 1888. Binger estimated the population as 2,500 to 3,000 inhabitants.

Notable People 
 Ibrahim Traoré Intertim President of Burkina Faso

References 

Populated places in the Boucle du Mouhoun Region